Sutot is a village in tehsil Laxmangarh of Sikar district in Rajasthan, India. It is situated at a distance of 24 km west of Sikar on the Sikar-Salasar road.

References
Jat Jwala Smarika, 25 December 2002

Villages in Sikar district